Gerald Shapland Carew, 5th Baron Carew (26 April 1860 – 3 October 1927)

He was the son of Shapland Francis Carew, younger son of Sir Robert Carew, 1st Baron Carew, and his wife Lady Hester Georgiana Browne, daughter of Howe Browne, 2nd Marquess of Sligo, in 1858.  He married Catherine Conolly, daughter of Thomas Conolly, MP. They had three children:

 William Francis Conolly-Carew, 6th Baron Carew (1905–1994)
 Hon. Gavin George Carew (1906–1997)
 Lt.-Cdr. Hon. Peter Cuthbert Carew (1908–1980)

Succeeded his cousin George Carew, 4th Baron Carew, as Baron Carew, a barony in the Peerage of Ireland and the Peerage of the United Kingdom upon his death in 1926.  He was succeeded by his son William Conolly-Carew, 6th Baron Carew.

Notes

References
Kidd, Charles & Williamson, David (eds.) (1990) Debrett's Peerage and Baronetage (1990 edition). New York: St Martin's Press, 

Carew, 5th Baron, Gerald Shapland Carew
Carew, 5th Baron, Gerald Shapland Carew
Gerald